Matthew McGrath (born 1 September 1958) is an Irish Independent politician and a Teachta Dála (TD) for the Tipperary constituency since being elected at the 2007 general election.

McGrath was first elected as a Fianna Fáil TD but he left the party in 2011 before the general election, and has contested elections as an independent candidate since.

Education and political career
McGrath was educated at St. Joseph's College, Cahir; Kildalton Agricultural College, County Kilkenny and University College Cork.

With Fianna Fáil
McGrath was a Fianna Fáil member of South Tipperary County Council from 1999 to 2007 and served as chairperson of the council from 2004 to 2005.

McGrath was first elected to the Dáil at the 2007 Irish general election as a Fianna Fáil TD for Tipperary South. 

McGrath was found not guilty of the assault of a teenager in south Tipperary following a trial in 2008. McGrath made a complaint to the Garda Ombudsman's office in relation to the handling of the investigation.

In October 2009, McGrath criticised the proposal by Noel Dempsey to lower the legal level of alcohol in drivers, claiming that for some people a small amount of alcohol made them less nervous behind the wheel, though he said he didn't condone drunk driving.
His comments were criticised by Road Safety Authority chairman Gay Byrne and the Automobile Association.

In June 2010, McGrath accused Minister for the Environment, Heritage and Local Government John Gormley of the Green Party of bullying Fianna Fáil over the bill to ban stag hunting, which was passed in the Dáil on 29 June 2010. Gormley said the bill was a part of the renewed programme for government and that it was a relatively minor piece of legislation, which should not have taken up so much Dáil time. McGrath voted against the bill and lost the Fianna Fáil parliamentary party whip as a result. He explained he was independent minded and would not be silenced by anybody. He further qualified his support for the government in September 2010.

As an Independent
On 25 January 2011, McGrath announced that he was leaving the Fianna Fáil party and would contest the 2011 general election as an Independent candidate. He denied that he was cynically resigning from the party in an attempt to save his own Dáil seat, saying that he had run out of “final straws” with Fianna Fáil. He also said that widespread unemployment, pay cuts, negative equity, the recent price hike at health insurer VHI and the recent leadership debacle had forced his hand.

At the election on 25 February, McGrath secured his seat on the fifth count, having polled 14.7 per cent of the first preferences, defeating a challenge from Labour's Senator Phil Prendergast. He is a member of the Rural Independents Technical group in the Dáil.

In 2015, McGrath was accused of plagiarising a speech he gave in the Dáil on ISIS from a resolution put forward by Congressman Jeff Fortenberry. McGrath denied the claims.

McGrath was re-elected in the newly formed Tipperary constituency in 2016, receiving 11,237 first preference votes (14.4%). He was again re-elected in 2020, with 9,321 first preference votes (11.4%).

Political views

McGrath is opposed to same-sex marriage, and was the only TD to speak against it in the Irish same-sex marriage referendum when it was debated in the Dáil. He said he would “probably” vote No in the referendum to allow same sex couples to marry in 2015.

McGrath is an anti-abortion advocate. He supported the "No" side in the 2018 abortion referendum. In November 2018 he supported amendments to the Regulation of Termination of Pregnancy Bill which would require pain relief to the foetus during termination, which were subsequently defeated. McGrath has met the Pope in the Vatican on numerous occasions, including one day prior to the 2018 visit by Pope Francis to Ireland for the World Meeting of Families. McGrath was highly critical of former President of Ireland Mary McAleese prior to the Pope's visit saying "obviously the lady has issues" and that people are "getting sick and tired" of the former president "hogging the airwaves." McAleese had been critical of the Catholic Church in the run up to the Papal visit.

McGrath opposed a minute of silence being held in the Dáil after the murder of George Floyd, saying that it was "none of our business" and calling it "showboating nonsense".

Controversies

Comments on COVID-19 and criticism
McGrath has attracted criticism from various politicians and from the Auschwitz Museum for his comments on COVID-19 and perceived sensationalist remarks by drawing comparisons between life in Nazi Germany and COVID-19 restrictions in Ireland. McGrath has referred to the pandemic as a "scamdemic" and has opposed public health lockdowns, declaring that "this wouldn't happen under Hitler".

McGrath has said that he will not be receiving a COVID-19 vaccine. When asked if he had received a COVID-19 vaccination, McGrath refused to answer, replying "My body, my choice" and comparing the vaccine regime to "1930s Nazi Germany".

On 28 April 2021, during the COVID-19 pandemic, McGrath said in the Dáil that COVID restrictions were returning to “Nazi Hitler's time”. Taoiseach Micheál Martin called the remarks “contemptible and disgraceful” and asked McGrath to withdraw them but McGrath refused. McGrath also accused the Taoiseach of making an "apartheid" decision by not allowing indoor dining, for which the Taoiseach accused him of holding a Trumpian view in denying the existence of the pandemic.

In July 2021, McGrath compared the concept of digital COVID-19 certificates to Germany during Nazi times, and the practice of giving badges to concentration camp prisoners during the Holocaust, stating "Is that what we have come to now. Are we back to 1933 in Germany? We’ll be all tagged in the yellow and the mark of the beast will be on us". McGrath was criticised by the Auschwitz Museum for these remarks, with the museum inviting him to read about the Holocaust and describing his remarks as "a sad symptom of moral and intellectual decline". McGrath was also criticised by Social Democrats TD Jennifer Whitmore for his comments. After McGrath doubled down and told the Irish Examiner reporter Aoife Moore "There is huge correlations, it’s exactly the same if you want to study it, exactly the same" when asked to make a comment, the paper called McGrath an "Intolerable idiot".

McGrath compared the extension of COVID emergency powers to apartheid on the 5 October 2021. He was criticised by Simon Coveney and Paul Murphy, with Murphy calling the remarks "non-acceptable".

Comments on Tony Holohan
In October 2020, McGrath made comments at a media briefing, asking where Ireland's Chief Medical Officer Tony Holohan "had been in the last few months", during which Holohan had been caring for his wife Emer, who had terminal cancer and was receiving pallative care. McGrath's remarks were branded as "shameful" by Fine Gael's Ciarán Cannon, who demanded he withdraw and apologise for his remarks. McGrath withdrew these remarks and offered his apologies for them.

Comments on refugees
In June 2022, McGrath was criticised for saying on Today with Claire Byrne that he would like a cap on the number of refugees. He was criticized by Paul McAuliffe, who said "Mattie is trying to pretend that the Government doesn’t care about the Irish people. There are women and children in refugee tents in Poland. We are not prepared to leave people there." Senator Garret Ahearn condemned "the reckless comments by Mattie McGrath" and said they were a disgrace.

Far-right influences

In December 2022, McGrath was accused of spreading far-right rhetoric in the Dáil by Tánaiste Micheál Martin. Martin claimed that "far-right ideologues" were influencing groups in the Dáil and that McGrath "had a script" prepared for him that alluded to conspiracy theories such as "the Great Reset".

References

External links

 

1958 births
Living people
Alumni of University College Cork
Fianna Fáil TDs
Independent TDs
Local councillors in South Tipperary
Members of the 30th Dáil
Members of the 31st Dáil
Members of the 32nd Dáil
Members of the 33rd Dáil
People from Clonmel
Politicians from County Tipperary